Alex Tschekaloff is an American bridge player.

Bridge accomplishments

Wins

 North American Bridge Championships (2)
 Blue Ribbon Pairs (1) 1969 
 Nail Life Master Open Pairs (1) 1965

Runners-up

Notes

External links

American contract bridge players